Saint-Denis-De La Bouteillerie is a municipality in the Canadian province of Quebec, located in the Kamouraska Regional County Municipality.

Prior to November 16, 2013, it was known simply as Saint-Denis and was a parish municipality. The name change was a revival of an old name used from 1845 to 1855.  When the name was officially changed, it was also retroactively declared that the name should have been known as Saint-Denis de Kamouraska since 1855.

It contains the house of Jean-Charles Chapais, a National Historic Site of Canada.

See also
 List of municipalities in Quebec

References

External links
 

Municipalities in Quebec
Incorporated places in Bas-Saint-Laurent